Jackson Withrow (born July 7, 1993) is an American professional tennis player. He played college tennis at Texas A&M. Withrow has a career-high ATP doubles ranking of World No. 45 achieved on March 6, 2023.

Career

2011
Withrow competed at the 2011 US Open doubles tournament, where he received together with his partner Jack Sock a wildcard. In the first round they were beaten by 15-seeded Xavier Malisse from Belgium and Mark Knowles from the Bahamas.

2016
At the 2016 NCAA Men's Tennis Championship, Withrow and Texas A&M Aggies teammate Arthur Rinderknech lost the individual doubles championship to UCLA's Mackenzie McDonald and Martin Redlicki in the final match.

2017: First ATP win in doubles
Withrow and Sock received a wild card for the 2017 Cincinnati Masters doubles tournament, where they lost to Juan Sebastián Cabal and Fabio Fognini in the first round.

He won his first ATP level doubles match with partner Austin Krajicek at the 2017 US Open by defeating Philipp Oswald and André Sá in the first round.

2018: First ATP doubles title
Withrow and Sock made a doubles run to the title at the 2018 Delray Beach Open, first defeating Leander Paes and Purav Raja in the first round. Next the pair upset the Bryan Brothers in the quarterfinals in 3 sets, then won their next match to set up a finals match against Nicholas Monroe and John-Patrick Smith. Withrow and Sock prevailed in three sets to win the tournament, marking Withrow's first ever ATP tour-level title as well as his first doubles title.

2019: US Open quarterfinal in doubles

At the 2019 Australian Open he reached the third round with Jack Sock, defeating second seeded pair and previous year finalists Juan Sebastian Cabal / Robert Farah (tennis) on the way.

At the 2019 US Open, partnering  Sock, he reached his first Grand Slam quarterfinal defeating the Bryan Brothers en route but lost to 15th seeded pair of Jamie Murray/Neal Skupski.

2020-21: New partnership with Lammons, Win over World No. 1 doubles team 
He reached a career-high doubles ranking of World No. 66 on January 13, 2020.

At the 2021 US Open partnering Nathaniel Lammons they defeated top pair Nikola Mektić and Mate Pavić in the first round in 75 minutes.

2022: Second ATP title, top 50 debut 
At the 2022 San Diego Open he won his first ATP title as a team with Lammoms. The pair moved up 25 places to 35th in the doubles race. He made his top 50 debut in the rankings on 26 September 2022.

The pair ended the season at No. 32 in the ATP doubles rankings.

2023: Three ATP finals
With Lammons he reached the final at the ATP 500 at the Mexican Open in Acapulco.

Doubles performance timeline

Current after the 2023 Dallas Open.

Note: No activity between 2012 and 2015.

ATP career finals

Doubles: 7 (2 titles, 5 runner-ups)

ATP Challenger and ITF Futures finals

Doubles: 23 (16–7)

References

External links
 
 
 

American male tennis players
Living people
1993 births
Tennis people from Nebraska
Texas A&M Aggies men's tennis players